Evacuation or Evacuate may refer to:
 Casualty evacuation (CASEVAC), patient evacuation in combat situations
 Casualty movement, the procedure for moving a casualty from its initial location to an ambulance
 Emergency evacuation, removal of persons from a dangerous place due to a disaster or impending war
 Medical evacuation (MEDEVAC), evacuating a patient by plane or helicopter or even train

Specific evacuations
 Evacuation of East Prussia, after World War II
 Evacuations of civilians in Britain during World War II
 List of World War II evacuations

Entertainment
 "Evacuation" (song), a song by Pearl Jam
 Evacuation (TV series), a children's show in the UK
 Evacuation (The Bill), an episode of British TV series The Bill
 Evacuate (band), a punk rock band from Southern California
 Evacuate (album), a 1982 album by Chelsea

Other
 Defecation and/or urination, especially involuntarily after death
 the physical process of creating a vacuum
 Forced migration, a coerced and often violent movement of persons away from their home region